Babel is a quarterly magazine about languages and linguistics. Its aim is to make linguistics and linguistic research accessible to a wider audience. The magazine is available in digital format and in print and offers individual and institutional subscriptions with international shipping. Its first issue appeared in November 2012.

Babel is based and produced at the Department of Linguistics and Modern Languages at the University of Huddersfield, by an editorial team headed by Professors Lesley Jeffries and Dan MacIntyre. British linguist David Crystal serves as linguistic consultant. The magazine was endorsed by comedian Stephen Fry.

Babel Lecture 
The magazine has been organising the annual Babel Lecture, a public talk about linguistics. The inaugural lecture was held in 2015 by Game of Thrones language expert Brendan Gunn.

Babel Young Writers' Competition
The magazine also organises an annual Young Writer's Competition, for which there are two age groups one can compete in - a 16 - 18 category and an undergraduate category. Submitted essays may be on any linguistics-related topic, up to 2,500 words in length. Winners of the competition receive a free year's subscription to Babel Magazine. The first edition of the competition ran in 2014, and past winners have written on topics such as British Sign Language, Spoonerisms, and language death.

References

External links
Babel magazine website

Linguistics journals
Magazines established in 2012
Quarterly magazines published in the United Kingdom
University of Huddersfield
Mass media in Yorkshire